Patrick William Maloney (January 19, 1888 – June 27, 1979) was a Major League Baseball outfielder. Maloney played for the New York Highlanders in 1912. In 25 career games, he had a .215  batting average with 17 hits in 79 at-bats. He batted and threw right-handed.

Maloney was born in Grosvenor Dale, Connecticut, and died in Pawtucket, Rhode Island.

External links

1888 births
1979 deaths
Major League Baseball outfielders
Baseball players from Connecticut
New York Highlanders players
Brockton Shoemakers players
Lewiston Cupids players
Worcester Busters players
Worcester Boosters players